Sugar Transporter can refer to:

Science 
 Sugar transporter is a synonym of Glucose transporter

Ships 
 - two ships with this name
, a British-built bulk carrier launched in 1970 and sunk in 1991